Norcatur is a city in Decatur County, Kansas, United States.  As of the 2020 census, the population of the city was 159.

History
Norcatur was founded in 1885 near the Nebraska border. Norcatur was named from its location near the border between Norton and Decatur counties. The first post office in Norcatur was established in October, 1885.

Geography
Norcatur is located at  (39.836514, -100.188402).

Demographics

2010 census
As of the census of 2010, there were 151 people, 74 households, and 40 families living in the city. The racial makeup of the city was 98.7% White and 1.3% from two or more races. Hispanic or Latino of any race were 2.0% of the population.

There were 74 households, of which 12.2% had children under the age of 18 living with them, 43.2% were married couples living together, 6.8% had a female householder with no husband present, 4.1% had a male householder with no wife present, and 45.9% were non-families. 40.5% of all households were made up of individuals, and 13.6% had someone living alone who was 65 years of age or older. The average household size was 2.04 and the average family size was 2.73.

The median age in the city was 51.3 years. 17.9% of residents were under the age of 18; 7.2% were between the ages of 18 and 24; 14.6% were from 25 to 44; 33.8% were from 45 to 64; and 26.5% were 65 years of age or older. The gender makeup of the city was 56.3% male and 43.7% female.

2000 census
As of the census of 2000, there were 169 people, 81 households, and 54 families living in the city. The racial makeup of the city was 100.00% White.

There were 81 households, out of which 17.3% had children under the age of 18 living with them, 60.5% were married couples living together, 4.9% had a female householder with no husband present, and 32.1% were non-families. 30.9% of all households were made up of individuals, and 19.8% had someone living alone who was 65 years of age or older. The average household size was 2.09 and the average family size was 2.58.

In the city, the population was spread out, with 16.6% under the age of 18, 2.4% from 18 to 24, 26.0% from 25 to 44, 22.5% from 45 to 64, and 32.5% who were 65 years of age or older. The median age was 51 years. For every 100 females, there were 79.8 males. For every 100 females age 18 and over, there were 93.2 males.

The median income for a household in the city was $24,750, and the median income for a family was $29,792. Males had a median income of $23,125 versus $16,250 for females. The per capita income for the city was $14,028. About 7.3% of families and 12.4% of the population were below the poverty line, including 9.5% of those under the age of eighteen and 23.8% of those 65 or over.

Education
The community is served by Oberlin USD 294 public school district. Norcatur schools were closed in school unification. The Norcatur High School mascot was Norcatur Cardinals.

Notable people

 Dewey Adkins, Major League Baseball player
 Elden Auker, Major League Baseball pitcher

References

Further reading

External links

 City of Norcatur
 Norcatur - Directory of Public Officials
 Norcatur city map, KDOT

Cities in Kansas
Cities in Decatur County, Kansas